This is a list of Albany State Golden Rams football players in the NFL Draft.

Key

Selections

References

Albany State

Albany State Golden Rams NFL Draft